Alice "Ally" Lundström or Flodström (born 15 November 1935) is a Swedish former competitive figure skater. She is the 1957 Nordic champion and a two-time Swedish national champion (1956–57). She represented Sweden at the 1956 Winter Olympics in Cortina d'Ampezzo.

As a junior, Lundström was a member of Luleå SK. During her senior career, her skating club was Stockholms ASK.

Competitive highlights

References 

1935 births
Figure skaters at the 1956 Winter Olympics
Swedish female single skaters
Living people
Olympic figure skaters of Sweden
People from Söderhamn
Sportspeople from Gävleborg County
20th-century Swedish women